Greatest Hits albums are compilations of successful, previously released songs by a particular music artist or band. For a list of such albums, see List of greatest hits albums.

Greatest Hits or variants may also refer to:

Music

Non-compilation albums
Greatest Hits (Phil Ochs album), seventh and final studio album by Phil Ochs, 1970
The Greatest Hits (Funkoars album), second studio album by Funkoars, 2006
The Greatest Hit (Money Mountain), debut studio album by Blue Orchids, 1982
Greatest Hits (Kari Peitsamo ja Ankkuli album), fifth studio album by Kari Peitsamo ja Ankkuli, featuring cover versions of his favourite songs, 1980
Greatest Hits (Remo Drive album), first studio album by Remo Drive, 2017
Greatest Hits (Waterparks album), fourth studio album by Waterparks, 2021

Songs
"The Greatest Hit" (song), a no.100 charting song by Annie
"The Greatest Hit", song by Six Finger Satellite from Paranormalized

Other media
"Greatest Hits" (Lost), an episode of Lost
Greatest Hits (TV series), a television series
Greatest Hits (PlayStation range), a set of Sony video games re-released at a lower price
Greatest Hits (comics), a six-issue comic book limited series
Greatest Hits Radio, a radio station in the United Kingdom

See also
Greatest Hits Tour (disambiguation)
Greatest Hits & More (disambiguation)